Frager is a surname. Notable people with the surname include:

Henri Frager (1897–1944), Member of the French Resistance during World War II .
Malcolm Frager (1935–1991), American piano virtuoso and recording artist
Robert Frager (born 1940), American social psychologist
Tom Frager (born 1977), French songwriter and performer